Sociedad Deportiva Chantada is a football team based in Chantada in the autonomous community of Galicia. Founded in 1970, it plays in the Preferente Autonómica – Group Norte. Its stadium is Campo Municipal Sangoñedo.

Season to season

0 season in Tercera División

Current squad

El sd chantada milita en segunda division, es uno de los equipos mas historicos lla que cuenta con:
2 Ligas de campeones
7 Ligas españolas
12Copas del rey
9Supercopa de españa
1 Supercopa de europa
4 Europas Ligue

External links
Official website
Futbolme.com profile

Football clubs in Galicia (Spain)
Divisiones Regionales de Fútbol clubs
Association football clubs established in 1970
1970 establishments in Spain